Halifax Shopping Centre, located in Halifax, Nova Scotia, is Atlantic Canada's largest multi-building shopping centre. Mumford Professional Centre is immediately adjacent to the annex property and represents an additional  of leaseable space.

The centre is open 9:30 a.m. to 9:00 p.m. Monday through Saturday and noon to 5:00 p.m on Sunday.

History

The first public record of the Halifax Shopping Centre was filed in 1956 when Eaton's applied for a re-zoning of a property which was formerly the site of the St. Patrick's Boys Home. Work on the future site of the enclosed Halifax Shopping Centre site began in February 1961.

The centre was developed by Webb and Knapp (Canada) Ltd.  It was designed and engineered by staff members at Webb and Knapp in consultation with The Graham Company and Associate Architect Gregory Lambros. Anglin-Norcross Maritime Ltd. served as general contractors on the initial construction.

Halifax Shopping Centre was opened at 9:30 A.M. on Tuesday, September 11, 1962 – billed as "The Marketplace of the Maritimes". The grand opening publicity claimed that "never in the history of Halifax have so many stores opened on one day!" The Thursday, September 13 edition of The Chronicle Herald included a thank you from Halifax Shopping Centre's owners, by Triton Ltd., which estimated the opening day crowd to have been 27,000 people.

In 1989, Halifax Shopping Centre was expanded to include a food court, an additional  of retail space and three parking decks.

The redevelopment was renamed Halifax Shopping Centre Annex. The Metro Transit (now Halifax Transit) Mumford Terminal was also relocated at this time.

In 2007, Halifax Shopping Centre underwent a major renovation to update the enclosed shopping centre, its decor and way-finding.

In 2015, a mass shooting to take place at the mall was foiled by police only a few hours before the attacks would have begun.

Also in 2015, a new $70 million renovation was underway at the Shopping Centre, replacing the Fairlanes bowling alley with a new food court called the Terrace. Construction was completed in fall 2016.

Stores and services 

Halifax Shopping Centre contains over 170 stores within the enclosed mall and adjacent annex. The majority of the enclosed centre's vendors are fashion and premium fashion purveyors. This is the only Atlantic Canada location for many prominent retailers, including Apple, Aritzia, Browns, Club Monaco, H&M, Michael Kors and Torrid.

The Centre also contains stores specializing in cosmetics, athletic and casual footwear for men, women and children, children's clothing stores, bath and beauty products, electronics, jewellery, sporting equipment, specialty foods, greeting cards, vitamins and supplements, cellphone and tablet cases, books, gifts, and other unique items.

Cellphone and phone/internet service providers include Bell Aliant, Eastlink, Koodo, Rogers, TBooth, Telus, Virgin Mobile, and Wireless Wave.

Amenities include Atlantic Dental, Atlantic Medical (located in Lawton's), a post office (located in Lawton's), and Dr. Charles Wu (optician). Dry-cleaners and tailoring services are offered at Halifax Shopping Centre Annex.

Major Stores In Halifax Shopping Centre
Sport Check,
Lawton's,
H&M,
Michael Kors,
Apple Store,
Levi's,
GAP,
Reitmans,
ZARA,
Foot Locker,
Minor Stores/Banks In Halifax Shopping Centre
Freak Lunchbox,
Koodo,
Telus,
Fido,
Rogers,
Eastlink,
TBooth,
GAP Kids,
Bell Aliant,
Virgin Mobile,
Wireless Wave,
Atmosphere,
Bath & Body Shop,
Roots,
Aritzia,
Dynamite,
Mac,
Club Monaco,
Garage,
Sunglasses Hut,
Soft Moc,
Mountain Warehouse,
La Vie En Rose,
Eclipse,
Skechers,
The Source,
Fossil,
Hakim Optical,
La Senza,
American Eagle Outfitters,
RBC Royal Bank,
Game Stop,
Restaurants Located In The Food Court
A&W,
Timhortons,
KFC,
Taco Bell,
Subway,
New York Fires,
Ms Fields,
Pretzel Maker,
Starbucks,
Moucou Wok,
Cheese Curds,
Mezza Lebanese Kitchen,
Free-Standing Major Stores/Restaurants/Banks
Mark's,
Moores,
Shoppers Drug Mart,
Walmart,
Burger King,
Timhortons,
McDonald's,
BMO Bank Of Monteral,
Winners,
Sobeys,
Dollarama,
Free Standing Minor Sotres/Restaurants
Pizza Pizza
NSLC Liquor And Beer,
Ardene,
CUA,
First Choice Hair Cutters,
Former Major/Minor Stores/Restaurants/Banks
Sears Closed 2018 Demolished To Extend The Mall
Eaton's Closed 1991 Replaced With Sears
Pizza Delight Closed 2010 Replaced With Telus
Dairy Queen Closed 2020 Demolished
Thai Express Closed 2020 Demolished
Pier 1 Imports Closed 2020 Free Standing Replaced With Dollarama
Cleve's Source For SportsClosed 2022 Free Standing Now Abandoned
PenningtonsClosed 2020 Free Standing Replaced With Cleve's Source For Sports Which Closed Later In 2022
Addition ElleClosed 2020 Free Standing Closed Before In 2013 But Reopened In 2018 After The Closure In Bayers Lake Replaced With Ardene
DollaramaInside The Mall Closed 2017 It Was Demolished
McDonald'sInside Walmart Closed 2021 Replaced With Burger King

Transportation

Halifax Shopping Centre is located in the west end of the Halifax Peninsula.  It is accessible by car from Bayers Road and Mumford Road. The Halifax Shopping Centre Annex property stretches from Mumford Road to Chebucto Road and the nearby Armdale traffic circle.

The shopping centre also includes a Halifax Transit terminal, referred to as Mumford Terminal, which is located in the Annex development, immediately across Mumford Road from the enclosed primary shopping centre building.  The Halifax Shopping Centre Annex parking lot is also a designated Park and Ride location.

Mumford Terminal is accessible via the following Halifax Transit routes:

 1 Spring Garden
 2 Fairview
 3 Crosstown
 9 Greystone (9A)/Herring Cove (9B)
 22 Armdale
 24 Leiblin Park

 25 Governors Brook
 26 Springvale
 28 Bayers Lake
 29 Barrington
 91 Hemlock Ravine
 415 Purcells Cove

There are plans to build a new, enlarged Mumford Terminal on part of the shopping centre parking lot. The project, endorsed by Halifax Regional Council in 2019, is intended to add capacity and improve the passenger experience.

See also
 List of largest shopping malls in Canada

References

External links
Halifax Shopping Centre

Shopping malls established in 1962
Shopping malls in Halifax, Nova Scotia
Tourist attractions in Halifax County, Nova Scotia